Abacetus quadripustulatus is a species of ground beetle in the subfamily Pterostichinae. It was described by Peyron in 1858.

References

quadripustulatus
Beetles described in 1858